Troy Gentile (born Troy Francis Farshi; October 27, 1993) is an American actor best known for his role as Mark in Hotel for Dogs and Barry Goldberg on the comedy series The Goldbergs (2013–2023), and for playing young versions of Jack Black‘s characters in Nacho Libre and Tenacious D in The Pick of Destiny (both 2006).

Early life 
Gentile was born in Boca Raton, Florida, to an Italian-American mother, Debra (née Gentile) and an Iranian father, Albert Farshi. When he was four years old, his family moved to Los Angeles, California. 

He attended community college before he was cast in The Goldbergs.

Career 
He portrayed a young Craig Ferguson on a segment of The Late Late Show With Craig Ferguson in October 2005. He later appeared in films such as Bad News Bears, Nacho Libre, Good Luck Chuck, Drillbit Taylor, and Hotel for Dogs. Since September 2013, he has portrayed Barry Goldberg in the ABC comedy series The Goldbergs.

Filmography

Film

Television

Awards and nominations

Film

References

External links 
 
 

1993 births
Living people
Male actors from Florida
People from Boca Raton, Florida
American male child actors
American male film actors
American male television actors
21st-century American male actors
American people of Iranian descent
American people of Italian descent